Angelina (minor planet designation: 64 Angelina) is an asteroid from the central region of the asteroid belt, approximately 50 kilometers in diameter. It is an unusually bright form of E-type asteroid.

Discovery and naming 

Angelina was discovered on March 4, 1861, by a prolific comet discoverer, E. W. Tempel, observing from Marseilles, France. It was the first of his five asteroid discoveries.

The naming of Angelina caused some controversy. It was chosen by Benjamin Valz, director of the Marseilles Observatory, in honour of the astronomical station of that name operated by Baron Franz Xaver von Zach on the mountains above the city. At the time, asteroids were supposed to receive names from classical mythology, and several astronomers protested the choice. Tempel noted that if the second 'n' were removed, the complaints would be satisfied (referring to Angelia, a minor Greek deity). However, Valz's choice stayed.

Physical characteristics 

Angelina is an uncommon form of E-type asteroid; it is the third largest E-type after 44 Nysa and 55 Pandora, and has an exceptionally high albedo. Back when asteroids were generally assumed to have low albedos, Angelina was thought to be the largest of this class, but modern research has shown that its diameter is only a quarter of what was previously assumed, an error caused by its exceptional brightness. Traditional calculations had suggested that since Angelina has an absolute magnitude of 7.7 and an albedo of 0.15, its diameter would have been around 100 km. However, a 2004 occultation showed a cross-sectional profile of only 48x53 km. Angelina was observed by Arecibo radar in January 2010.

References

External links 
 2004 Angelina occultation (cross-sectional profile of 48x53 km)
 
 

000064
Discoveries by Wilhelm Tempel
Named minor planets
000064
000064
18610304